The Duchess of Buffalo is a 1926 American silent romantic comedy film produced by and starring Constance Talmadge and released through First National Pictures. It is based on the 1916 Broadway stage musical Sybil, which is this film's alternate title.

Cast
Constance Talmadge as Marian Duncan
Tullio Carminati as Lt. Vladimir Orloff
Edward Martindel as Grand Duke Gregory Alexandrovich
Rose Dione as Grand Duchess Olga Petrovna
Chester Conklin as Hotel Manager
Lawrence Grant  as The Commandant
Martha Franklin as The Maid
Jean De Briac as Adjutant
Ellinor Vanderveer as Lady in Waiting (uncredited)

References

External links

Stills at silentfilmstillarchive.com

1926 films
American silent feature films
Films based on musicals
Films directed by Sidney Franklin
First National Pictures films
1926 romantic comedy films
American romantic comedy films
Films produced by Joseph M. Schenck
Films set in Russia
Films set in the 1900s
American black-and-white films
1920s American films
Silent romantic comedy films
Silent American comedy films